Colt International (founded in 1999) is an aviation service company that specializes in contract jet fuel and international trip support. The corporate headquarters is in Webster, Texas (a suburb of Houston), with satellite offices based in Calgary, São Paulo, and Geneva. The company started with 5 employees in 1999 and has grown to over 150 employees in 2011.

Awards 
Colt International was ranked as the #1 Best International Trip Planning company for 2012 based on customer satisfaction, service quality, dependability and value in Professional Pilot Magazine for the annual PRASE award rankings.

References

Aircraft ground handling companies
American companies established in 1999